Breznička may refer to several places in Slovakia.

Breznička, Poltár District
Breznička, Stropkov District